Thomas Edwin Bruce (April 17, 1952 – April 9, 2020) was an American competitive swimmer, Olympic champion, and former world record-holder.

Bruce was a graduate of Marian A. Peterson High School in Sunnyvale, California. He attended the University of California, Los Angeles (UCLA), where he swam for the UCLA Bruins swimming and diving team in National Collegiate Athletic Association (NCAA) competition.  He represented the United States at the 1972 Summer Olympics in Munich, Germany.  At Munich, he won a silver medal in the men's 100-meter breaststroke, and also earned a gold medal swimming the breaststroke leg for the winning U.S. team in the men's 4×100-meter medley relay.  Bruce, together with his relay teammates Mike Stamm (backstroke), Mark Spitz (butterfly) and Jerry Heidenreich (freestyle), set a new world record of 3:48.16.

See also
 List of Olympic medalists in swimming (men)
 List of University of California, Los Angeles people
 World record progression 4 × 100 metres medley relay

References

External links
 

1952 births
2020 deaths
American male breaststroke swimmers
World record setters in swimming
Olympic gold medalists for the United States in swimming
Olympic silver medalists for the United States in swimming
People from Red Bluff, California
Sportspeople from Sunnyvale, California
Swimmers at the 1972 Summer Olympics
UCLA Bruins men's swimmers
Medalists at the 1972 Summer Olympics
20th-century American people